Paolo Veronese painted several works on the Mystic Marriage of Saint Catherine, including:

Mystic Marriage of Saint Catherine (Veronese, c. 1547–1550)
Mystic Marriage of Saint Catherine (Veronese, 1575)